= Frederick Van Fleteren =

Academic and former priest

Frederick Van Fleteren (1941–2022) was a Belgian academic who was previously a Catholic priest and Augustinian friar.

Van Fleteren was a scholar of St. Augustine of Hippo and St. Anselm. He was Professor of Philosophy at La Salle University and Distinguished Professor of Medieval Philosophy and Chair of St. Augustine at the Collegium Augustinianum Graduate School of Philosophy and Theology.
